Khafa Khafa Zindagi is 2018 Pakistani family drama television series produced by Sadia Jabbar under Sadia Jabbar Production. The series focuses on trials and tribulations of a married couple played by Ali Safina and Sumbal Iqbal along with Shagufta Ejaz, Dua Malik and Aiza Awan in pivotal roles. It was first aired 29 August 2018 on A-Plus TV.

Plot
This a story about  broken family of Sara and Bilal. They have two children. They wanted divorce.
Sara is a very selfish woman with an even more selfish mother, who breaks up her marriage, gives up on her loving husband and two kids on the insistence of her greedy mother.

Cast
Ali Safina as Bilal
Sumbal Iqbal as Sara 
Shagufta Ejaz as Sara’s Mother
Dua Malik as Amber; Bilal's sister
Aiza Awan as Afroz; Sara's sister
Sohail Asghar as Sara's Father
Farah Ali as Sara's elder sister
Azra Mohyeddin as Bilal's Mother
Hassan Niazi as Abid; Bilal's friend and Sara's office colleague
Maryam Tiwana as Raimeen; Abid's ex-wife
Anas Yaseen as Gulzar (child); Bilal and Sara's son
Ibrahim as Khriat (child); Bilal and Sara's daughter

Soundtrack

References

External links 

Pakistani drama television series
2018 Pakistani television series debuts
2019 Pakistani television series endings
Urdu-language television shows
A-Plus TV original programming